Haiduan railway station is a railway station located in Guanshan Township, Taitung County, Taiwan. It is located on the Taitung line and is operated by Taiwan Railways. It is named after nearby Haiduan Township.

Around the station
 Bunun Cultural Museum

References

1924 establishments in Taiwan
Railway stations opened in 1924
Railway stations in Taitung County
Railway stations served by Taiwan Railways Administration